Great Repeal Bill may refer to two items of United Kingdom legislation:

 Great Repeal Bill (2008 proposal), Conservative proposal which fed into the Protection of Freedoms Act 2012
 European Union (Withdrawal) Act 2018, first proposed under the title "Great Repeal Bill" in 2016 by the May ministry as part of Brexit

See also
 Great Reform Bill – the Reform Act 1832
 Statute Law (Repeals) Act, a stock short title used to repeal UK enactments since 1969